Galium porrigens is a species of flowering plant in the coffee family known by the common names graceful bedstraw and climbing bedstraw. It is native to the west coast of North America from Oregon to Baja California.

Galium porrigens can be found in many habitats from forest to coastal shrubland, and is often a member of the chaparral plant community. This is a small, woody perennial herb with climbing stems. It is covered in tiny prickly hairs which help it climb and hang. Leaves are arranged in whorls of four about the thin stems. The tiny leaves are oval-shaped, pointed, and green, often with red or purple tips and edges. The plant is dioecious, with male plants producing clusters of staminate flowers and female individuals producing solitary flowers at the leaf axils. Both types of flower are yellowish to reddish. The fruit is a berry.

Varieties
Two varieties are recognized as of May 2014:

Galium porrigens var. porrigens - Oregon, California, Baja California
Galium porrigens var. tenue (Dempster) Dempster - Oregon, California

References

External links
Jepson Manual Treatment
USDA Plants Profile
Photo gallery
Turner Photographics, Wildflowers of the Pacific Northwest
University of California at Irvine, climbing bedstraw
Gardening Europe

porrigens
Flora of California
Flora of Baja California
Flora of Oregon
Flora of North America
Dioecious plants
Flora without expected TNC conservation status